Urta Daraq (also Romanized as Ūrtā Daraq) is a village in Ajorluy-ye Sharqi Rural District, Baruq District, Miandoab County, West Azerbaijan Province, Iran. At the 2006 census, its population was 136, in 27 families.

References 

Populated places in Miandoab County